WEC 12: Halloween Fury 3 was a mixed martial arts event promoted by World Extreme Cagefighting on October 21st, 2004 at the Tachi Palace Hotel & Casino in Lemoore, California. The card featured many future superstars such as Jason "The Punisher" Lambert, Nate Diaz, Brad Imes, Chris "Lights Out" Lytle, "The Sandman" James Irvin, Joe "Diesel" Riggs, Chael Sonnen, and MMA legend "Mr. International" Shonie Carter. The main event saw Doug Marshall take on Carlos Garcia.

Results

See also 
 World Extreme Cagefighting
 List of WEC champions
 List of WEC events
 2004 in WEC

External links
 WEC 12 Results at Sherdog.com

World Extreme Cagefighting events
2004 in mixed martial arts
Mixed martial arts in California
Sports in Lemoore, California
2004 in sports in California